Koiak 11 - Coptic Calendar - Koiak 13

The twelfth day of the Coptic month of Koiak, the fourth month of the Coptic year. On a common year, this day corresponds to December 8, of the Julian Calendar, and December 21 of the Gregorian Calendar. This day falls in the Coptic season of Peret, the season of emergence. This day falls in the Nativity Fast.

Commemorations

Feasts 

 Monthly commemoration of the Archangel Michael

Saints 

 The departure of Saint Hedra, the Bishop of Aswan 
 The departure of Saint John the Confessor

Other commemorations 

 Assembly of a Synod in Rome against Novatus the Priest

References 

Days of the Coptic calendar